The discography of Juicy J, an American rapper, consists of five studio albums, 22 singles (in addition to 34 as a featured artist), two promotional singles and eighty music videos.

Albums

Studio albums

Collaborative albums

Mixtapes

Singles

As lead artist

As featured artist

Promotional singles

Other charted and certified songs

Other guest appearances

See also
 Juicy J production discography
 Three 6 Mafia discography

Notes

References

Discographies of American artists
Hip hop discographies